When There Are Grey Skies is an album by the jazz pianist Red Garland, recorded in 1962 and released the following year on the Prestige label.

Reception

Jazz critic Harvey Pekar, writing for DownBeat magazine, had this to say about Garland: "Garland is one of the most important figures in recent jazz piano history.  His method of block-chording has influenced many other pianists.  Also important is the way he establishes a groove with his left hand..."

Track listing 
"Sonny Boy" (Brown, DeSylva, Henderson, Jolson) - 5:16
"My Honey's Lovin' Arms" (Meyer, Ruby) - 3:40
"St. James Infirmary" (Primrose) -	6:41
"I Ain't Got Nobody" (Graham, Peyton, Williams) - 3:55
"Baby Won't You Please Come Home" (Warfield, Williams) - 4:08
"Nobody Knows the Trouble I See" (Traditional) - 12:00
"My Blue Heaven" (Donaldson, Whiting) - 3:51 Bonus track on CD reissue

Personnel 
 Red Garland - piano
 Wendell Marshall - double bass
 Charlie Persip - drums

References 

1963 albums
Red Garland albums
Albums produced by Ozzie Cadena
Prestige Records albums